"Bitch Bad" is a song by American rapper Lupe Fiasco. It is the second single off his album Food & Liquor II: The Great American Rap Album Pt. 1. It was released on June 25, 2012. "Bitch Bad" tackles misogyny in hip hop culture, the use of the word "bitch" in rap music, the effects of these things on society and children, and the psychological concept of the Madonna–whore complex.

Music video
The music video was released on August 22, 2012 on MTV's RapFix Live and premiered on YouTube the same day. The video was directed by Gil Green. He dedicates the video to Paul Robeson and the "many black actors who endured the humiliating process of blackface in America". MDMA made a cameo appearance singing his lines in the end of the video.

Critical reception
The song has garnered praise from artists such as Janelle Monáe, Talib Kweli, Jill Scott, and Kanye West, who even posted the video on his Twitter. The song, however, was not well received by Spin Magazine, who wrote that the song and the video were "mansplaining...half-baked conscious hip-pop...muddled, measly-mouthed missive...reckless social commentary...poorly thought-out grab for attention", and claimed that Lupe has a "moronic lyrics-over-everything attitude" which led him on a Twitter rant and also led him to encourage fans to boycott the magazine.

Charts

References

2012 singles
Lupe Fiasco songs
Music videos directed by Gil Green
Protest songs
Songs about the media
Songs with feminist themes
Song recordings produced by the Audibles
2012 songs
Atlantic Records singles
Songs written by James Giannos
Songs written by Dominic Jordan
Songs written by Poo Bear